Kenneth Washington is an American retired basketball player and coach.  As a player, he won two national championships playing college basketball with the UCLA Bruins and represented the United States national team in the 1970 FIBA World Championship.  He was also the first head coach in UCLA women's basketball history.

Washington, a  guard out of Robert Smalls High School in Beaufort, South Carolina, played for coach John Wooden at UCLA from 1963 to 1966, where he was a key member of Wooden's first two NCAA championship teams in 1964 and 1965.  As the sixth man of those teams, Washington helped the Bruins establish what is now known as a storied tradition.  Washington was particularly effective in his two championship appearances, netting 26 points and grabbing 12 rebounds in the final of the 1964 NCAA tournament and scoring 17 in the 1965 championship and earning a spot on the All-Final Four team.

After graduation, Washington was drafted by the San Francisco Warriors in the eighth round (71st pick overall) of the 1966 NBA draft, but he never played in the league.

In 1970, Washington was a member of the U.S. team that played in the 1970 FIBA World Championship in Yugoslavia, finishing fifth.  He was the second-leading scorer on the team, averaging 12.4 points per game and playing in all 9 contests.

In 1974, Washington was named the first intercollegiate head coach in UCLA women's basketball history.  He coached one season, leading the Bruins to an 18-4 record behind star Ann Meyers.

He is the uncle of Major League Baseball player Jason Heyward.

References

Year of birth missing (living people)
Living people
Basketball players from South Carolina
Guards (basketball)
Sportspeople from Beaufort, South Carolina
San Francisco Warriors draft picks
UCLA Bruins men's basketball players
UCLA Bruins women's basketball coaches
United States men's national basketball team players
American men's basketball players
American women's basketball coaches
1970 FIBA World Championship players